National Lampoon's Christmas Vacation 2 (also known as National Lampoon's Christmas Vacation 2: Cousin Eddie's Island Adventure) is a 2003 American made-for-television comedy film. It premiered December 20, 2003 on NBC and stars Randy Quaid and Miriam Flynn reprising their roles as Cousin Eddie and Catherine, along with Dana Barron reprising her role as Audrey Griswold. It is a spin-off/sequel to the 1989 film, National Lampoon's Christmas Vacation.

Plot
The story begins with Cousin Eddie at his latest workplace, a nuclear facility where he 'works' alongside a chimpanzee. When the chimpanzee outperforms him in every test (specifically mental agility), the decision is made to fire him. Upon finding out the news, the two get into an argument which results in the chimpanzee biting him.

With Christmas approaching, Eddie is worried about what this job loss will mean for him and his family and he decides to talk to his former boss. Although the thought never occurs to him, the nuclear company is convinced that he will sue. As a preemptive countermeasure, they offer him and his family (along with Audrey Griswold and his Uncle Nick) a free vacation to an island in the South Pacific. While on holiday they go on a boat ride. While Eddie attempts to catch a shark, they get lost and eventually shipwrecked on an isolated island.

Eventually Eddie is able to prove himself a man by providing for his family and they all celebrate Christmas together on the island. Shortly after, they are rescued - although when the pilot becomes incapacitated, it is left to Eddie to land the rescue plane safely. Once landed, Eddie discovers he has been given his job back.

Cast
 Randy Quaid as Eddie Johnson
 Miriam Flynn as Catherine Johnson
 Dana Barron as Audrey Griswold, who tags along after dumping her married boyfriend Daniel. Barron is the first of the Griswold children to reprise their former roles, having originated the role of Audrey 20 years earlier in 1983's National Lampoon's Vacation.
 Ed Asner as Uncle Nick, Eddie's uncle who tags along after his wife leaves him.
 Beverly Garland as Aunt Jessica
 Fred Willard as Professor Doornitz, Eddie's boss.
 Sung Hi Lee as Muka Luka Miki, the family's guide around the island.
 Jake Thomas as Clark "Third" Johnson, Eddie and Catherine's teenage son.
 Julian Stone as Melbourne Jack, the seapilot.
 Eric Idle as English Victim, a passenger on the plane. Idle also played the Bike Rider in European Vacation.

Production
In June 2003, it was announced Jake Thomas, Fred Willard and Ed Asner had joined the cast.

See also 
 List of Christmas films

References

External links
 

2000s Christmas comedy films
2000s adventure comedy films
Adventure television films
2000s English-language films
Christmas television films
National Lampoon's Vacation (film series)
2003 television films
2003 films
Film spin-offs
NBC network original films
Television sequel films
American Christmas comedy films
Films about vacationing
American adventure comedy films
Christmas adventure films
2000s American films